Philip M. Mininberg (November 12, 1886 – March 19, 1951) was a Russian Empire-born American obstetrician. He owned and operated Brooklyn Doctors Hospital, formerly the Borough Park Maternity Hospital. He also owned a nurses' residence across the street.

The application of adrenalin on a boy described as born dead was first made on babies by Philip Mininberg.

Early life
Mininberg was born in Poltava, Russian Empire in 1886 and brought to the United States as a child. He received his medical diploma from New York University in 1915.

Career
In 1923, Mininberg successfully revived "by unusual means" a baby boy (a twin to a girl) born apparently dead. The key was that he "pierced the chest wall" and injected a solution of adrenalin directly into the heart. That baby weighed more than two pounds; in 1949, the technique was used on a 15 oz. premature infant.
 
Mininberg practiced medicine in Brooklyn beginning in 1915. The last 28 years of his life he owned and operated Brooklyn Doctors Hospital (formerly Boro Park Maternity Hospital).

Family
Mininberg died of a stroke in 1951. He was survived by his wife, their three children, four sisters, and a grandson.

References

1886 births
1951 deaths
20th-century American physicians
New York University alumni
People from Brooklyn
Emigrants from the Russian Empire to the United States